The Kasanje Kingdom (1620–1910), also known as the Jaga Kingdom, was a Central African state. It was formed in 1620 by a mercenary band of Imbangala, which had deserted the Portuguese ranks. The state gets its name from the leader of the band, Kasanje, who settled his followers on the upper Kwango River. The Kasanje people were ruled by the Jaga, a king who was elected from among the three clans who founded the kingdom.

In 1680, the Portuguese traveller António de Oliveira de Cadornega estimated the kingdom had 300,000 people, of whom 100,000 were able to bear arms. However, it is noted that this claim may be exaggerated.
The kingdom of Kasanje remained in a constant state of conflict with its neighbours, especially the kingdom of Matamba, then ruled by queen Nzinga Mbande. The Imbangala state became a strong commercial center until being eclipsed by Ovimbundu trade routes in the 1850s. Kasanje was finally incorporated into Portuguese Angola in 1910–1911.

List of kings of Kasanje 
The kings of Kasanje are listed below based on a compilation of several different contemporary king lists by Joseph C. Miller.

Location
Kasanje is located on the upper Kwango River in what is now Angola.

References

External links
 Kasanje at Britannica Concise
 Kasanje at Britannica Online
 The Foundation of the Kingdom of Kasanje

Former monarchies of Africa
States and territories established in 1620
States and territories disestablished in 1910
Early modern Angola
Former countries in Africa